The 2021–22 season is the 5th season in the existence of Juventus and the club's 5th consecutive season in the top flight of Italian women's football. In addition to the domestic league, Juventus will participate in this season's editions of the Coppa Italia, the Supercoppa Italiana, and the UEFA Champions League. 

On 8 June 2021, Juventus hired Joe Montemurro as team manager.

Pre-season and friendlies

Overview 
On 25 July 2021, Juventus played a friendly against Maltese side Birkirkara winning 12–0 against them. On 31 July, Juventus won against Servette through a Bonansea brace and one goal from Girelli and Berti. On 4 August, Juventus beat 2–1 French side Montpellier. in the 11th minute Girelli gave Juventus the lead with a goal from a Lundorf Skovsen's cross. In the 25th minute Girelli doubled the result after a one-on-one with Lisa Schmitz. In the 38th minute Montpellier's Johanna Elsig shortened the gap through an header. On 8 August, Juventus played against Barcelona in the Joan Gamper Trophy losing 6–0. On 12 August, they played a friendly against Pomigliano losing 3–1.

Matches 
Results list Juventus' goal tally first.

Serie A 

Juventus began the league season on 28 August 2021 against Pomigliano winning 3–0.

Matches

League table

Coppa Italia

Group stage

Quarter-finals

Semi-finals

Final

UEFA Champions League 

As winners of the 2020–21 Serie A, Juventus entered the Champions League in the first round of the Champions Path. On 2 July 2021, Juventus were drawn to play in the four-teams bracket 8 of the first round. In the same date, Juventus were also drawned to play the semi-final of the first round against Macedonian side Kamenica Sasa. On 7 July, UEFA decided to play the final four at Juventus Training Center, which is Juventus' stadium. On 18 August, Juventus played the semi-finals of the first round winning 12–0 against  Kamenica Sasa. Juventus played the final against Austrian side St. Pölten winning 4–1 thanks to a Barbara Bonansea brace and one goal from Cristiana Girelli and Lina Hurtig. On 1 September, in the second round, Juventus met Albanian side Vilazina winning 2–0 in the first leg with goals from Girelli and Hurtig. Eight days later Juventus played the second leg winning 1–0, thus qualifying in the group stage.

First round

Bracket

Matches

Second round

Group stage

Quarter-finals

Supercoppa Italiana

See also 
 2021–22 Juventus F.C. season
 2021–22 Juventus F.C. Under-23 season

Notes

References 

Juventus F.C. (women) seasons
2021–22 in Italian football
Juventus Women